"You and I Tonight" is the third single from Canadian rock band Faber Drive's Juno-nominated second album, Can't Keep a Secret. It was officially released to Canadian radio on March 25, 2010 and is reminiscent of their earlier hits such as "Tongue Tied" and "When I'm with You".

Music video
The music video for "You and I Tonight" was filmed in Vancouver and features a classic "break up, make up" story. The video starts off with a boyfriend and girlfriend who appear to have had a fight. The girl walks away and toward the camera with tears streaming down her face. In between are shots of Faber Drive performing on a street filled with cars in the pouring rain. The boyfriend yells at the girl, who rips off a locket she has on and throws it on the floor. She leaves the room and the boyfriend gets up and throws a vase at a wall. Just as the vase hits the wall and shatters into pieces, time appears to have stopped and everything, except the boyfriend and later the girlfriend, is frozen in time, including a cat appearing to jump down from a shelf. Puzzled, he looks around the room and grabs a rose from the broken vase. Meanwhile, the girlfriend is outside and tries to hail a taxi, but it drives away. A van drives by through a puddle of water which is about to splash the girl, but as she ducks, time stops and she avoids being soaked.

After shots of Faber Drive, the boyfriend is seen leaving the house and stops at two frozen people engaging in conversation. With time still frozen, the camera then pans to the front of a car and zooms out to a scene of people in cars and umbrellas. The boyfriend is seen searching for his girlfriend. Additional shots of people frozen in time include a man pouring trash from a garbage can into another. The girlfriend is now seen also looking for her boyfriend, peering into stopped cars. She then gets inside a taxi as her boyfriend is shown on the street looking for her. He looks into the same taxi she went in, but she is not there. He sees her standing alone in the rain. In the final scenes, the boyfriend approaches her and comforts her. He pulls out the rose and gives it to her. They kiss and the silhouette of their heads make out the crude shape of a heart.

Charts

References

Faber Drive songs
2009 songs
2010 singles
Universal Records singles